Angel Angelov Genchev  is a Bulgarian weightlifter who competed for Bulgaria. He claimed the gold medal in weightlifting at the 1988 Summer Olympics – Men's 67.5 kg but was disqualified after he tested positive for furosemide, an IOC banned substance. It became a scandal because earlier in the meet fellow Bulgarian weightlifter Mitko Grablev had also been disqualified, after claiming a gold medal in his division, when his drug test came back positive, also for furosemide. The Bulgarian weightlifting team was forced to withdraw midway through the Weightlifting competition. Of six athletes known to have lifted more than triple their bodyweight, Genchev's 202.5 kg world record was the heaviest ever performed in competition. Genchev is a European champion in the 75 kg category from Cardiff in 1988. He was also a bronze medalist at the 1994 World Championships in Istanbul. He won the European Cup in 1987 from the tournament in Miskolc, Hungary, with the team of Bulgaria. There he set a world record in snatch - 170 kg. Angel is a four-time World and European junior champion.

Genchev served some time in prison for shooting at a cab driver in Bulgaria in 2001.

Genchev competed in the 2017 World Masters games in Auckland, New Zealand and won Gold in the M77kg division for the 50-54years age group. He snatched 95 kg and Clean and jerked 120 kg.

Genchev competed in the 2017 European Masters Championships in Halmstad, Sweden, snatching 105 kg and Clean and Jerking 132 kg to win his division.

Genchev competed in the 2018 European Masters Championships in Budapest, Hungary, snatching 90 kg and Clean and Jerking 112 kg to win his division.

Genchev competed in the 2018 World Masters Championships in Barcelona, Spain, snatching 96 kg and Clean and Jerking 122 kg to win his division.

References

External links
 

1967 births
Living people
Bulgarian male weightlifters
Olympic weightlifters of Bulgaria
Weightlifters at the 1988 Summer Olympics
World record setters in weightlifting
World Weightlifting Championships medalists
European Weightlifting Championships medalists
Bulgarian sportspeople in doping cases
Doping cases in weightlifting
Competitors stripped of Summer Olympics medals
People from Targovishte
20th-century Bulgarian people
21st-century Bulgarian people